Eliana Koon Yee Fu is a British materials scientist and innovator. She works as an aerospace and medical manager at Trumpf Laser Technology. In 2022, she was named the TCT Women in 3D Printing Innovator of the Year.

Early life and education 
Fu is from London. As a young person, she had never heard of materials science, but was given a leaflet by someone at Queen Mary University of London and decided to study it as an undergraduate degree. She moved to Imperial College London for her doctoral research, where she studied titanium aluminides using powder metallurgy. She moved to Loughborough University for a postdoctoral position, before moving to the United States. She was a postdoctoral fellow at Clemson University. She has said that she had a culture shock moving to South Carolina as she was used to living in London. She joined an engineering company in Rotherham, where she worked in a traditional forge shop.

Research and career 
In 2007, Fu joined the Titanium Metals Corporation (TIMNET), a titanium manufacturer, where she worked in manufacturing. She moved to SpaceX, and was based in Las Vegas. She was made an advisor to Eric Garcetti committee on advanced materials manufacturing.

Fu moved to Relativity Space, where she worked on additive manufacturing for novel rockets. At the time, Relativity Space were the only company in the world focused on 3D printing an entire rocket. She was their first woman engineer.

In 2021, Fu was recruited by Trumpf Laser Technology to serve as their Industry Manager for Aerospace and Medical. She focused on sustainability in manufacturing, and the development of green laser technologies for 3D printing. That year she joined the technical advisory board of Hyperion Metals. In 2022 she was named the TCT Women in 3D Printing Innovator of the Year.

Personal life 
Fu is a triathlete. She has cycled with Chrissie Wellington. She wrote a book about being a woman working at SpaceX.

References 

Living people
Alumni of Imperial College London
Alumni of Queen Mary University of London
SpaceX people
Materials scientists and engineers
Clemson University faculty
Year of birth missing (living people)
21st-century British women scientists
21st-century British engineers
21st-century women engineers
Engineers from London